Astragalus iodanthus is a species of flowering plant in the legume family, Fabaceae, known by the common names Humboldt River milkvetch and violet milkvetch. It is native to the western United States, where its range includes California, Idaho, Nevada, Oregon, and Utah. It grows on hills and in valleys in barren sandy and volcanic soils in habitat such as sagebrush.

This perennial herb produces several prostrate stems up to 40 centimeters long. The compound leaves are made up of 9 to 21 rounded or teardrop-shaped leaflets each up to 1.8 centimeters long. The inflorescence is a raceme of flowers in shades of reddish purple or white to cream with a purple tip on the keel petal. There are up to 25 flowers in a raceme, and they are crowded when first blooming but spread out over time. The fruit is a legume pod up to 4 centimeters long, becoming dark, mottled, and papery to leathery with age.

There are two varieties of this species:
var. diaphanoides (snake milkvetch) has a denser coating of rough hairs, particularly along the leaf edges and midrib.
var. iodanthus is less hairy, having rough hairs mainly in the inflorescence.

References

iodanthus
Flora of the Western United States